Christian Sagna  (born November 9, 1982) is a Senegalese former football player who played as a striker.

External links
 
 
 

1982 births
Living people
Senegalese footballers
Dinaburg FC players
FK Sūduva Marijampolė players
FC Petrolul Ploiești players
FC Gloria Buzău players
ASA 2013 Târgu Mureș players
Expatriate footballers in Lithuania
Expatriate footballers in Latvia
Expatriate footballers in Romania
A Lyga players
Latvian Higher League players
Liga I players
Liga II players
Senegalese expatriate sportspeople in Romania
Senegalese expatriate sportspeople in Lithuania
Senegalese expatriate sportspeople in Latvia
Association football forwards